The 1939 Utah State Aggies football team was an American football team that represented Utah State Agricultural College in the Mountain States Conference (MSC) during the 1939 college football season. In their 21st season under head coach Dick Romney, the Aggies compiled a 3–4–1 record (2–3–1 against MSC opponents), finished fifth in the MSC, and were outscored by a total of 81 to 76.

Schedule

References

Utah State
Utah State Aggies football seasons
Utah State Aggies football